Challenger Colles is a range of hills on Pluto in Sputnik Planitia, discovered by New Horizons in July 2015. It is named in honor of the Space Shuttle Challenger, which was destroyed with all seven crew lost on January 28, 1986. The name Challenger Colles became official on May 27, 2022.

References

Extraterrestrial hills
Geography of Pluto
Surface features of Pluto